The 1901–02 French Rugby Union Championship of first division was won by Racing club de France that beatSBUC in the final.

Racing was qualified for the final thanks to his victory against Stade Français and SBUC beat F.C. Lyon for 6–0.

Final 

Having a lot of players injured or sick, SBUC put Mathéo, a former player and supporter as prop, in order to have 15 players on the ground.

External links
 Compte rendu de la finale de 1902, sur lnr.fr

1902
France
Championship